N44  may refer to:
 N44 (emission nebula), in the Large Magellanic Cloud
 A44 motorway (Netherlands)
 , a minelayer of the Royal Danish Navy
 London Buses route N44
 Nebraska Highway 44, in the United States
 Robert J. Miller Air Park, in Ocean County, New Jersey, United States
 Sena language